The term North Indian Culture officially describes the cultural heritage of the eight North Indian states of Punjab, Uttarakhand, Jammu & Kashmir, Chandigarh (Union Territory), Haryana, Delhi, Himachal Pradesh, Rajasthan and Uttar Pradesh (which itself means "Northern State"). Other states which are not formally part of North India, but which are traditionally — culturally and linguistically — seen to be so are Gujarat, Jharkhand, Madhya Pradesh, Maharashtra and Bihar. North Indian culture reflects the diversity of traditions and customs of the vast region it encompasses. North Indian Culture is mainly in sanatana traditions and customs, with the assimilation of — and impact from — other cultures over long periods of history. North Indian culture reflects the diversity of traditions and customs of the vast region it encompasses.

Culture

Traditional clothing

Women traditionally wear salwar kameez, gagra choli, sari and phiran. Dupatta is worn to complete the outfit. Men traditionally wear kurta, achkan, kameez and sherwani for upper garment, lower garment includes dhoti, churidar, and shalwar. Pagri is usually worn around the head to complete the outfit, especially in rural areas. In states like Uttarakhand and Himachal pradesh, women usually wear ghaghra and a full sleeved blouse or kurta salwar adorning a coat and an orni (headscarf). The men usually wear kurta and pants or shirt) coat with a Himachali cap. In the states of Punjab, Jammu and Kashmir, Himachal Pradesh and Haryana, traditional dress is Kameez Shalwar. In the states of Rajasthan, Uttar Pradesh, and southern Haryana, it is ghagra choli. Pagri is worn in various region styles and is the symbol which shows one's status and the respect in which one is held. In urban centres and as well as rural areas western influence can easily be seen nowadays.

Cuisine

Wheat, along with rice and millets forms the staple diet of North India. Wheat is usually served in the form of roti or chapatis along with saag, bhaaji, tarkari or saalan (vegetarian curry dishes). Other wheat breads include: deep fried puris and shallow fried parathas. During winters, flatbreads made of millets like bajra and maize are common. Rice dishes called Bhaat are generally paired with lentil & bean dishes. Various varieties of rice dishes like Jeera Bhaat, Khaare Chawal, Matar Chawal, Meethe Chawal, Kesariya Bhaat form part of North Indian cuisine.

Dal Roti (Lentil & flatbread) and Dal Chawal (Lentil and rice) are common vegetarian combos in North Indian cuisine. Vegetarian diet is a norm almost everywhere except in Valley of Kashmir or hilly regions, however, the non-vegetarian food is also popular. Mughlai cuisine, especially that of Lucknow and Delhi, is known for non-vegetarian dishes with a distinctive aroma, taste and with a different style of cooking. Vaishno dhabas serving Satvik Cuisine can be found all over North Indian region.

Milk & its by-products along with Leguminous food products like Lentils & beans are abundantly used in North Indian cuisine. Some of the popular lentil dishes (Dals) from North India include Chana Dal, Moong Dal, Arhar dal, Masur Dal, Mothh Dal & Urad Dal (which in restaurant is served with butter & is branded by name Dal Makhani). Other bean dishes include Rajma, Lobia, Kala Chana & Kabuli Chana. Rajma Chawal from Jammu region are particularly popular in entire India. Kala Chana (along with Lapsi & Puri) is cooked during Ashtami day of Navratri festival. Besan (Indian Gram flour) is particularly used to prepare number of North Indian dishes like Kadhi, Pakodas, Missi Roti etc.

Rajasthani cuisine is famous for its dishes like daal-baati, churma, etc. A variety of desserts can be found in North India, like Jalebi crispy sugary circular dessert also comes in another variant called imarti, lapsi (Indian sweet pudding also known by the name halwa), Rajasthani ghevar & gujia, kheer (Indian Rice pudding), petha, mathura peda, bal mithai (from Kumaon), to name but a few.

Music and Dance 

Hindustani classical music or Shastriya Sangeet is the classical music of North India. It is a tradition that originated in Vedic ritual chants and has been evolving since the 12th century. Around the 12th century, Hindustani classical music diverged from what eventually came to be identified as Carnatic classical music. The central notion in both these systems is that of a melodic mode or raga, sung to a rhythmic cycle or tala. These principles were refined in the Natyashastra by Bharata (2nd-3rd century AD) and the Dattilam (probably 3rd-4th century)). Indian classical music has seven basic notes, Sa Re Ga Ma Pa Dha Ni, with five interspersed half-notes, resulting in a 12-note scale. The rhythmic organization is based on rhythmic patterns called Taal. The melodic foundations are called ragas. Noted representatives of Shastriya Sangeet with a worldwide acclaim are Pandit Ravi Shankar and Ustad Ali Akbar Khan.

The rich cultural diversity of North India is most clearly shown by the many different folk dance styles found here. Starting with Bhangra (men's dance) and Giddha (women's dance) from Punjab to Kathak in Uttar Pradesh; from Ghoomar and Kalbeliya dance from Rajasthan to Nati from Himachal Pradesh; from Jagars and Pandva Nritya from Uttarakhand to Rouf of Kashmir celebrates the richness of culture and traditions of North India.
Kud dance of Jammu & Kashmir is the way to thank local deities in the night of rainy season with the beats of drum like instrument Narsingha. Kathak is one of the eight classical dance forms as conferred by Sangeet Natak Akademi. This dance form traces its origins to the nomadic bards of ancient northern India, known as Kathaks, or storytellers. Some believe it evolved from Lord Krishna's raas lilas, forms of which have also evolved into the popular Garba-style dances popular in other parts of region and Gujarat. Raas lilas portrays the love stories of lord Krishna. A dance form which depicts the eternal love. It was quintessential theatre, using instrumental and vocal music along with stylized gestures, to enliven the stories.

Architecture and Art

The splendor and vastness of the architectural heritage of North India can easily be demonstrated by the fact that out of twenty-three cultural world heritage sites in India which have been declared by UNESCO, ten are in North India. The Taj Mahal, a perfect blend of Muslim and Indian architecture, is one of the new seven wonders of the world. The Mahabodhi Temple complex at Bodh Gaya, Bihar built by Emperor Ashoka in 260 BC, marks the enlightenment of Siddhartha Gautam Buddha. Khajuraho temple and Buddhist monuments of Sanchi in Madhya Pradesh finds itself in the list of world heritage sites. Other renowned architectural and holy sites are Sri Harmandir Sahib ("The Golden Temple") in Amritsar, Punjab, Urban and Architectural Work of Le Corbusier in Chandigarh, Dilwara Temples of Mount Abu, Rajasthan to name only a few. A different genre of paintings evolved in North India especially the miniature paintings. Rajput Painting a style of Indian painting that evolved and flourished during the 18th century, in the royal courts of Rajputana. Rajput paintings depict a number of themes, events of epics like the Ramayana and the Mahabharata, Krishna's life, beautiful landscapes, and humans.

One of the best-known examples of North Indian sculpture is the Lion capital of Ashoka, Sarnath. It is the source for the national emblem of India and hints at the richness and grandeur of the ancient Mauryan Empire. The Rampurva Bull capital is one of the best specimens of animal sculpture. Two different schools of art namely the Gandhara and Mathura schools of art evolved which represented the developments in sculptures, stucco, and clay as well as in mural paintings. The Kushana kings, particularly Kanishka, encouraged the Gandhara artists to sculpture themes from Buddha's life and the Jatakas. The distinctive school of art which grew here is called the Gandhara school of art. A large number of the images of the Buddha and the Bodhisattvas were produced. Mathura art, however, reached its peak during the Gupta period (AD 325 to 600).  The human figure reached its most sublime representation in the Gupta classical phase when divine images, conceived and rendered in human shape, attained a superhuman aspect and manifested great spiritual import. The sculptures were marked by sharp and beautiful features, graceful and slim bodies, with many folds of transparent drapery and a new style of coiffure.

Literature

North India was the birthplace of Kalidasa, who wrote classic Sanskrit plays like Mālavikāgnimitram, Abhijñānaśākuntalam and Vikramōrvaśīyam and poems like Raghuvaṃśa, Kumārasambhava, Ṛtusaṃhāra and Meghadūta in which the use of imagination and similes remains unequaled by any other literary work. Apart from these Sanskrit dramas, Pāṇini's Ashtadhyayi standardized Sanskrit grammar and phonetics and left an indelible mark on these aspects of Sanskrit. Panini was a grammarian from approximately 5th century BC, his Ashtadhyayi is looked upon as a masterpiece and as a study in brevity and completeness.

Medieval North India had great literary scholars like Tulsidas, Surdas, Chand Bardai, Amir Khusro whose works Ramcharitmanas, Sur Sagar, Prithiviraj Raso and Khamsa-e-Nizami respectively contributed to the richness of literature. From the 19th century onwards Khadiboli became the general Hindu language; Khadiboli with heavily Sanskritized vocabulary or Sahityik Hindi (Literary Hindi) was popularized by the writings of Swami Dayananda Saraswati, Bhartendu Harishchandra and others. Other important writers of this period are Munshi Premchand, Mahavir Prasad Dwivedi, Maithili Sharan Gupt, R N Tripathi and Gopala Sharan Sinha. Premchand's works, such as Godaan and Gaban have been translated into various languages, and are known for their subtlety and depiction of human psychology and emotions.

See also
 
Culture of India
Sūtak, Rules of Impurity
North India
Jammu & Kashmir
Himachal Pradesh
Punjab
Chandigarh
Haryana
Uttarakhand
Delhi
Rajasthan
Uttar Pradesh

Notes

References and bibliography

 NZCC Compilation. "Flavours of India", North Zone Cultural Centre, Ministry of Culture, Government of India.
 Puran Chand Sharma. "Sanskriti ke Stambh", North Zone Cultural Centre, Ministry of Culture, Government of India.
 Kālidāsa; Johnson (editor), W. J. (2001), The Recognition of Śakuntalā: A Play in Seven Acts, Oxford and New York: Oxford University Press, 
 MacDonell, Arthur Anthony (2004), A History of Sanskrit Literature, Kessinger Publishing, 
 Massey, Reginald (2006), India's Dances, Abhinav Publications, 
 Thapar, Romila (1990), A History of India, 1, New Delhi and London: Penguin Books, 

c
Indian culture